Edit is a feminine given name related to Edith.  It may refer to:

 Edit Bauer (born 1946), Slovak politician
 Edit Herczog (born 1961), Hungarian politician
 Edit Miklós (born 1988), Hungarian-Romanian alpine ski racer
 Edit Perényi-Weckinger (born 1923), Hungarian former gymnast
 Edit Soós (1934–2008), Hungarian actress
 Edit "Eddie" Janko-Reagan, a police office in the TV series Blue Bloods
 Edit Stefanović, protagonist of the 2009 Serbian animated film Technotise: Edit & I

Feminine given names
Hungarian feminine given names